Philippe Goddin (born May 27, 1944, in Brussels, Belgium) is a leading expert and literary critic of The Adventures of Tintin, and author of several books on Tintin and his creator, Hergé.  He was general secretary of the Fondation Hergé from 1989 to 1999.

Career
He has written numerous books on the subject, which include Hergé and Tintin, Reporters.  He produced a biography, Hergé: lignes de vie.

His masterwork is the seven-volume (totalling 3000 pages) Hergé - Chronologie d'une oeuvre (Hergé - Chronology of his work), which Belgian magazine La Libre called "Magnificent. Monumental. Unique in its kind." ("Magnifique. Monumental. Unique en son genre.")

His study of Tintin was published in English in 3 volumes as The Art of Hergé, Inventor of Tintin; Volume 1 was criticized by Publishers Weekly for being content to retell plots rather than providing critical analysis.  It was also published in Dutch as De Kunst van Hergé, schepper van Kuifje; Belgian newspaper De Standaard reviewed volume 2, awarding it 4/5 stars.

He also helped to keep the television series The Adventures of Tintin more true to the books.

Bibliography 

 2005 - Hergé - Chronologie d'une oeuvre Tome 1 - 1907/1931 (CHRONOLOGIE, 1) (French Edition) 
2003 - Hergé - Chronologie d'une oeuvre Tome 2 - 1931/1935 (CHRONOLOGIE, 2) (French Edition) 
2003 - Hergé - Chronologie d'une oeuvre Tome 3 - 1935/1939 (CHRONOLOGIE, 3) (French Edition) 
2012 - Hergé - Chronologie d'une oeuvre Tome 4 - 1939/1943 (CHRONOLOGIE, 4) (French Edition) 
2012 - Hergé - Chronologie d'une oeuvre Tome 5 - 1943/1949 (CHRONOLOGIE, 5) (French Edition) 
2009 - Hergé - Chronologie d'une oeuvre Tome 6 - 1950/1957 (CHRONOLOGIE, 6) (French Edition) 
2011 - Hergé - Chronologie d'une oeuvre Tome 7 - 1958/1983 (CHRONOLOGIE, 7) (French Edition) 
2007 - Hergé: lignes de vie 
2008 - The Art of Hergé, Inventor of Tintin; Volume 1 
2010 - The Art of Hergé, Inventor of Tintin; Volume 2 
2011 - The Art of Hergé, Inventor of Tintin; Volume 3

References

External links
 Interview with Le Monde (in French)

Tintin
1944 births
Living people
Hergé